Xiaotong Zhang is a Chinese swimmer.  She won a gold medal at the 2016 Paralympic Games.  She competes in the Paralympic class S11. She is a paralympic World Record and Asian Record holder.

References

Chinese female breaststroke swimmers
Swimmers at the 2016 Summer Paralympics
Paralympic gold medalists for Hong Kong
Living people
Medalists at the 2016 Summer Paralympics
Paralympic swimmers of China
Year of birth missing (living people)
S11-classified Paralympic swimmers
21st-century Chinese women